The following list includes manufacturing and assembly plants wholly owned or wholly operated by the Volvo Car Corporation, in addition to joint-venture plants in which Volvo Car held equity stakes.

The list excludes plants belonging to AB Volvo and Volvo Car parent companies, as well as contract assembly plants in which Volvo Car held no equity stake.

List of Volvo Car production plants

Notes

References

Volvo Cars
Volvo Car Production Plants